The Government Complex Daejeon, which is located in Dunsan-dong, Seo-gu at the city of Daejeon, is a set of four buildings holding several government agencies of South Korea. The area of the  Government Complex, Daejeon is 518,338 m2. The size of the building is 4 buildings and auxiliary buildings with 20 stories high. The total floor area is also 242,701 m2. The construction period is 1993.9.15 to 1997.12.20. Following is examples of government agencies using the Government Complex Daejeon.
 Korea Customs Service
 Public Procurement Service
 Cultural Heritage Administration
 National Statistical Office
 Korean Intellectual Property Office (KIPO)
 Small and Medium Business Administration
 Korea Forest Service
 Military Manpower Administration
 National Archives of Korea

See also 
 Government of South Korea

References

External links 
 Official site supported by Government Buildings Management Office in English 

Government buildings in South Korea
Buildings and structures in Daejeon